Home Is Where the Music Is is a 1972 jazz and Afrobeat double LP by Hugh Masekela issued by the joint American label Chisa/Blue Thumb Records. The album was included in the book 1001 Albums You Must Hear Before You Die.

Critical reception
Thom Jurek of Allmusic stated: "Home Is Where the Music Is, is a stone spiritual soul-jazz classic, that melds the sound of numerous emerging jazz schools in its pursuit of musical excellence; it succeeds on all counts and is one of the greatest recordings in Hugh Masekela's long career. In a year full of amazing titles, this is still a standout."

Miles Keylock of Channel 24 wrote: "Recorded at London's Island Studios a matter of months before his own departure to Guinea these 10 tracks (originally a double LP) find Masekela digging deep into his African jazz heritage. Gone are the patented pop jazz covers, replaced by inquisitive Afro-American conversations that range from rhythm 'n bluesy soaked soul jazz extrapolations on fellow exiled composer Caiphus Semenya's 'The Big Apple' to freewheeling Cape to Cuba township bop original groovers like 'Maseru' and the lilting ballad 'Nomali'."

Track listing

Personnel
Hugh Masekela – trumpet
Larry Willis – acoustic and electric piano
Dudu Pukwana – alto saxophone
Eddie Gomez – bass guitar
Makhaya Ntshoko – drums
Stewart Levine – producer 
Caiphus Semenya – producer 
Rik Pekkonen – engineer

References

External links

1972 albums
Blue Thumb Records albums
Hugh Masekela albums
Albums produced by Stewart Levine